The 1983 Midwestern City Conference men's basketball tournament (now known as the Horizon League men's basketball tournament) was held March 10–12 at Roberts Municipal Stadium in Evansville, Indiana.

Xavier defeated  in the championship game, 82–76, to win their first MCC/Horizon League men's basketball tournament.

The Musketeers received an automatic bid to the 1983 NCAA tournament as the #12 seed in the Midwest region. Xavier lost the play-in game to fellow #12 seed Alcorn State.

Format
Six of eight conference members participated in the tournament and were seeded based on regular season conference records.

Bracket

References

Horizon League men's basketball tournament
Tournament
Midwestern City Conference men's basketball tournament
Midwestern City Conference men's basketball tournament